Raymond Vincent Ferraro (born August 23, 1964) is a Canadian former professional ice hockey player and currently broadcaster for ESPN/ABC and formerly of TSN. He played for 21 seasons in the National Hockey League (NHL) for the Hartford Whalers (1984–1990), New York Islanders (1990–1995), New York Rangers (1995–1996), Los Angeles Kings (1996–1999), Atlanta Thrashers (1999–2002) and St. Louis Blues (2002).

Biography

Playing career 
Ferraro was a prolific scorer in junior hockey, including a 108-goal and 192-point season for the Western Hockey League (WHL)'s Brandon Wheat Kings in 1983–84. He also was a member of the 1982–83 Portland Winter Hawks squad that won the 1983 Memorial Cup. Ferraro's teammates on the championship-winning team included Cam Neely, Mike Vernon, Brian Curran, John Kordic, and other future NHLers.

In his NHL career, he scored 408 goals and 490 assists for a total of 898 points in 1,258 games spanning 18 seasons. He was named to the NHL All-Star Game in 1992, held in Philadelphia. He also had two 40-goal seasons.

Ferraro had a memorable Stanley Cup playoff run for the New York Islanders in 1993, scoring two overtime goals against the Washington Capitals as the Islanders defeated both the Capitals and the defending champion Pittsburgh Penguins. Ferraro assisted on David Volek's game- and series-winning goal during overtime of Game 7 against the Penguins. The goal advanced the Islanders to the Wales Conference Finals, which they lost to the eventual champion Montreal Canadiens. Ferraro finished that playoff season with team-leading totals in goals (13) and points (20).

Broadcasting 
Ferraro retired from the NHL on August 2, 2002. He has done work for ESPN hockey broadcasts, including on NHL 2Night with John Buccigross and Barry Melrose, where he began working while still an active player. On that show, Ferraro was often referred to as "Chicken Parm" by Buccigross after an accident with Chicken Parmesan moments before going on the air. He later worked as a studio analyst for the NHL on NBC, as a colour commentator on Edmonton Oilers broadcasts on Rogers Sportsnet West, and on Sportsnet's other hockey programs.

Ferraro works as a colour commentator and studio analyst for TSN Hockey, including the 2010 Winter Olympics for CTV. After Pierre McGuire left TSN for NBC/Versus, he became the lead color commentator. After Rogers Media, the parent of TSN's rival Sportsnet, gained the national NHL rights with effect in the 2014–15 NHL season, Ferraro became a color commentator for the network's regional NHL telecasts, primarily working Toronto Maple Leafs games.

On May 5, 2014, EA Sports announced that Ferraro would be an "Inside-the-Glass" reporter for NHL 15 along with play-by-play commentator Mike Emrick and color commentator Eddie Olczyk. He returned as an "Inside-the-Glass" reporter for NHL 16. On November 23, 2015, Ferraro became the first hockey broadcaster to broadcast a game where his child also played in the same game, with the Toronto Maple Leafs hosting the Boston Bruins at the Air Canada Centre.

During the 2019 NHL Awards, Ferraro was promoted to lead color commentator in NHL 20. Also in 2019, he and Darren Dreger started a podcast, The Ray and Dregs Hockey Podcast, hosted by TSN.

With ESPN regaining the rights to air NHL games, Ferraro returned to ESPN/ABC for the 2021–22 season, this time as lead colour commentator.  That season also saw Ferraro work his first ever Stanley Cup Final series as a color commentator at his "Inside the Glass" position, and he teamed with Sean McDonough and Emily Kaplan for the entire series. Ferraro left TSN after the season to focus on his work at ESPN/ABC.

Personal life 
Ferraro married his high school sweetheart, Tracey Ferraro. They divorced in the early 2000s. Together, they have two sons, Matt, born in 1988, and Landon, born in 1991. Landon, a centre, was drafted second overall by the Red Deer Rebels in the 2006 WHL Bantam Draft and in the second round of the 2009 NHL Entry Draft (32nd overall) by the Detroit Red Wings; he was later traded from Red Deer to the Everett Silvertips, where he was named team captain. Landon made his NHL debut with the Red Wings on March 18, 2014. Matt, a former goaltender, was drafted to the WHL in 2003 by the Prince George Cougars, but has since become a financial planner.

Ferraro remarried in 2004 to former U.S. women's ice hockey team captain Cammi Granato, who also worked as a women's hockey analyst during NBC's 2006 Winter Olympics and 2010 Winter Olympics coverage. The couple have two sons — Riley, who was born in December 2006, and Reese, born in December 2009. 

Following the Swedish women's team upset of the U.S. at the 2006 Winter Olympic games, Ferraro publicly criticised U.S. women's coach Ben Smith for failing to bring the best U.S. players to the games. His comments were broadcast on MSNBC during the intermission of a men's hockey game, and they appeared to be directly related to his wife being cut in August 2005 because she wouldn't give up her job at NBC Sports. In addition to Granato, several other veterans were also passed over in favour of younger, faster players. Some critics and fans also questioned Granato's cut from the team and cited it as a factor in the U.S. team's disappointing performance.

Ferraro currently lives in Vancouver, British Columbia. Ferraro played in the 1976 Little League World Series.

Transactions 
 November 13, 1990 — Traded by the Hartford Whalers to the New York Islanders in exchange for Doug Crossman.
 August 9, 1995 — Signed as a free agent with the New York Rangers.
 March 14, 1996 — Traded by the New York Rangers, along with Ian Laperrière, Nathan LaFayette, Mattias Norström and New York's 1997 fourth-round draft choice (Tomi Kallarsson), to the Los Angeles Kings in exchange for Jari Kurri, Marty McSorley and Shane Churla.
 August 9, 1999 – Signed as a free agent with the Atlanta Thrashers.
 March 18, 2002 — Traded by the Atlanta Thrashers to the St. Louis Blues in exchange for a 2002 fourth-round draft choice (Lane Manson).

Video games 
Ferraro is the current color analyst for EA Sports' hockey video games. He was the ice level reporter starting in NHL 15, working with NBC Sports’ Mike Emrick and Eddie Olczyk. He partnered with new play-by-play man James Cybulski, starting with NHL 20, after EA Sports dropped Emrick and Olczyk from the game.

Career statistics

Regular season and playoffs

International

Awards
Bob Brownridge Memorial Trophy (WHL leading scorer) - 1984
 WHL East First All-Star Team – 1984

See also 
 Captain (ice hockey)
 List of NHL players with 1000 games played

References

External links 
 
 

1964 births
Living people
Atlanta Thrashers captains
Atlanta Thrashers players
Binghamton Whalers players
Brandon Wheat Kings players
Canadian ice hockey centres
Canadian television sportscasters
Capital District Islanders players
Edmonton Oilers announcers
Hartford Whalers draft picks
Hartford Whalers players
Sportspeople from Trail, British Columbia
Los Angeles Kings players
National Hockey League broadcasters
New York Islanders players
New York Rangers players
Portland Winterhawks players
St. Louis Blues players
Ice hockey people from British Columbia
Canadian people of Italian descent